Jonathan Bennett (born May 4, 1965) is an American racing driver with residence in Charlotte, North Carolina. Bennett competes in the WeatherTech SportsCar Championship for his own team, CORE Autosport.

Racing career
Bennett competed for CORE Autosport in 2014, in the new United SportsCar Championship, driving the No. 54 PC car with Colin Braun. He and co-drivers Braun, James Gué and Mark Wilkins won the season-opening Rolex 24 at Daytona in the PC class followed by the 12 Hours of Sebring. Bennett and Braun went on to win races at Kansas Speedway and Watkins Glen International, propelling them to the 2014 PC Drivers' Championship and PC Team Championship as well as the newly created Tequila Patrón North American Endurance Cup. Bennett and Braun's success continued into 2015, where once again they claimed the PC Driver Championship in conjunction with CORE's PC Team Championship.

Bennett continues to drive for CORE Autosport with Braun in the IMSA WeatherTech SportsCar Championship PC class in 2016.

Racing record

Career summary

Motorsports career results

WeatherTech SportsCar Championship results
(key)(Races in bold indicate pole position. Races in italics indicate fastest race lap in class. Results are overall/class)

References

External links

Racing drivers from Kentucky
WeatherTech SportsCar Championship drivers
24 Hours of Daytona drivers
1965 births
Living people

Le Mans Cup drivers
Sports car racing team owners